Jim Frazier (born c. 1941) is a former American football coach and college athletics administrator. He served as the head football coach at Hastings College in Hastings, Nebraska from 1967 to 1970 and Missouri Southern State University from 1971 to 1985, compiling a career college football coaching record of 114–70–5.  Frazier led the 1972 Missouri Southern Lions football team to an NAIA Division II Football National Championship.

A native of McCune, Kansas, Frazier began his coaching career as line coach for the football team at Kingman High School in Kingman, Kansas for two years, from 1963 to 1964.  After earning a master's degree in physical education from Wichita State University, he went to Hastings in 1966 as assistant football coach, head baseball coach, and physical education instructor.  Frazier succeeded Dean Pryor as head football coach in 1967.

Head coaching record

Football

References

Year of birth missing (living people)
1940s births
Living people
Hastings Broncos baseball coaches
Hastings Broncos football coaches
Missouri Southern Lions athletic directors
Missouri Southern Lions football coaches
Wichita State University alumni
People from Crawford County, Kansas